Calliotropis wilsi is a species of sea snail, a marine gastropod mollusk in the family Eucyclidae.

Description
The height of the shell is 5.4 mm.

Distribution
This marine species occurs off the Philippines.

References

 Vilvens C. (2007) New records and new species of Calliotropis from Indo-Pacific. Novapex 8 (Hors Série 5): 1–72.

External links
 

wilsi
Gastropods described in 2006